Mircea Socolescu (14 July 1902 – 5 October 1993) was a Romanian bobsledder. He competed in the four-man event at the 1928 Winter Olympics.

References

1902 births
1993 deaths
Romanian male bobsledders
Olympic bobsledders of Romania
Bobsledders at the 1928 Winter Olympics
Sportspeople from Bucharest